Fellowship Church (FC) is Baptist Evangelical multi-site megachurch located in Grapevine, Texas, a suburb of Fort Worth. It is affiliated with the Southern Baptist Convention. FC's lead pastor has been Ed Young since its opening in 1989.

History
FC started in 1989 as a mission church of the First Baptist Church of Irving, Texas, and was initially known as "Fellowship of Las Colinas". Approximately 150 members of First Baptist Irving relocated to the new church. FC initially met in a rented facility next to the Irving Arts Center and across from MacArthur High School.

Thus, it moved across the parking lot to the nearby Irving Arts Center. During this time, FC tried the concept of "simultaneous services"—one group would meet at FC's facility while another would meet at the Arts Center. The FC music team would play at one site while Young preached at the other, then midway through the services the teams would switch places. The concept proved unsuccessful and was shortly dropped.

Meanwhile, FC began to look for a suitable site for its permanent facility. FC discovered a  site on heavily traveled State Highway 121 north of Dallas Fort Worth International Airport, which was being auctioned by the Resolution Trust Corporation. Though larger than FC wanted, FC did not have the option to bid on only a portion of the site—it had to bid on the entire site or not bid at all. FC agreed to bid on the site, and was the successful bidder; however, it had to borrow $1.675 million to make the payment. Approximately two years later, the announcement was made that Grapevine Mills would be built across the street from FC. Unsolicited offers came in for portions of the FC property, and eventually FC sold a  parcel on the north side of the property for the exact amount it had borrowed earlier, thus allowing it to begin construction debt-free.

In April 1998, FC finally completed and moved to its current facility and adopted its present name.

In 2020, the weekly attendance was 24,162.

Satellite locations

In early 2005, FC opened two satellite campuses, Fellowship Church Plano (which met at a church-owned facility in Plano, Texas) and Fellowship Church Uptown (which met at North Dallas High School). Fellowship Church Uptown was renamed to Fellowship Church Downtown after it moved to a church-owned facility in Downtown Dallas.

Later in 2005, a third satellite campus was added, Fellowship Church Alliance (which met at Northwest High School in Justin, Texas). In October 2007 the campus relocated to in a new facility west of downtown Fort Worth, near the museum district, was renamed Fellowship Church Fort Worth.

In 2006 FC opened a fourth campus and its first outside the DFW area, Fellowship Church Miami in South Miami. South Miami Campus has been closed as of March 2021. Property taken over by Vous Church.

In 2008, FC opened Allaso Ranch camp and retreat center in Hawkins, Texas, which also hosts a satellite weekend service.

In 2012, FC added an internet campus called Fellowship Live at FellowshipLive.com.

In 2017, South Biscayne Church in North Port, Florida became part of the FC family.  In January of 2022, the satellite location in FL was sold to another church, Foundation Church of Englewood. The next two weeks after the notice were the final weeks as Fellowship Church South Biscayne. 

In 2018, the FC Celina/Prosper campus relocated and is now in Frisco, TX.

In 2018, FC purchased Journey Church in Norman, Oklahoma.

All satellite campuses act as extensions of FC; though they have live music and their own staff, all sermons are broadcast from the Grapevine campus.

Programs
Fellowship Church is the location for Ed Young's annual leadership conference, the C3 Conference, also known as the Creative Church Culture Conference.

In September 2007, FC launched a website, ineed2change.com, in conjunction with a sermon series of the same name.

Since March 2013, Fellowship Church has hosted an annual citywide Good Friday service for the Dallas/Ft. Worth metroplex at the newly built Klyde Warren Park.

Bible college
In August 2013, Fellowship Church opened a leadership college, University of Next Level, designed to develop a generation of leaders to lead. Areas of study include theology, leadership development, and spiritual formation with a required internship. Degrees offered are a 2-year Associate in Church Leadership & Ministry and 1 year Diploma in Church Leadership and Ministry.

References

External links
Fellowship Church official site
Featured church Vision Magazine Fall 2003

Grapevine, Texas
Evangelical churches in Texas
Churches in Dallas
Southern Baptist Convention churches
Christian organizations established in 1989
Evangelical megachurches in the United States
Megachurches in Texas
Baptist multisite churches